Camptostroma roddyi is an extinct echinoderm from the Bonnia-Olenellus Zone the Early Cambrian Kinzers Formation near York and Lancaster, Southeastern Pennsylvania.  In life, it would have resembled a cupcake, with the axial skeleton forming a star pattern on the upper surface.  It was originally thought, on the basis of its medusoid shape, to be a jellyfish-like organism, but the fossils themselves clearly rule out the possibility of a gelatinous body - the stereom plates are clearly preserved and possess the calcitic cleavage pattern diagnostic of echinoderms.  It has been placed in a class of basal echinoderms, the Edrioasteroids.

Other species have been described from time to time, but all have since been reassigned to other genera - and often different phyla.

References

Edrioasteroidea
Prehistoric Crinozoa genera
Cambrian echinoderms
Cambrian animals of North America

Cambrian genus extinctions